The 2009 Iowa Hawkeyes football team represented the University of Iowa and the Iowa Hawkeyes athletic program during the 2009 NCAA Division I FBS football season.  The team played its home games at Kinnick Stadium in Iowa City, Iowa. 2009 marked Kirk Ferentz's 11th year as head coach of Iowa. The Hawkeyes finished the season as the 2010 Orange Bowl Champions.

The Hawkeyes came off a 9–4 season in 2008, including a win over South Carolina in the Outback Bowl and a 24–23 upset of Big Ten champion of Penn State.

Season

Schedule
The Hawkeyes played 13 opponents in the 2009 season, finishing 11–2 (6–2 in conference play) and defeated Georgia Tech in the 2010 Orange Bowl.

Rankings

Roster

Game summaries

Northern Iowa

Source: Box Score
    
    
    
    
    
    
    

The Hawkeyes struggled early, gaining just 104 yards of total offense in the first half. After trading field goals, UNI took a 10–3 lead after quarterback Pat Grace threw a 14-yard touchdown pass to Ryan Mahaffey. The Hawkeyes woke up in the second half, going 70 yards in six plays and getting an 11-yard touchdown run from Adam Robinson with under 10 minutes remaining in the third quarter. Iowa would regain the lead early in the fourth quarter when Tony Moeaki caught a touchdown pass from Ricky Stanzi.

After a Billy Hallgren field goal, the Panthers threatened late in the game, with Grace leading them down the field in the final minutes to set up a potential game-winning kick and an upset. Hallgren's first attempt was blocked, but the officials ruled the ball went behind the line of scrimmage and UNI recovered with one second left. Jeremiha Hunter blocked the second kick, sealing the victory for the Hawkeyes. This was the first time in FBS history that a team had blocked two field goals on consecutive plays.

Despite the win, Iowa's struggle against a Football Championship Subdivision opponent knocked them out of both the Associated Press and USA Today Top 25 polls until their upset of #5 Penn State at the end of the month.

Iowa State

Source: Box Score
    
    
    
    
    
    

The Cyclones scored first with a 46-yard field goal from Grant Mahoney in the first quarter. But Iowa was able to capitalize on good field position resulting from an onside kick attempt by Iowa State and took the lead for good on a one-yard pass from Ricky Stanzi to Brett Morse. The Hawkeyes benefitted from six turnovers, scoring four more touchdowns off Cyclone mistakes. Tyler Sash had three of Iowa's five interceptions, tying a school record.

Arizona

Source: Box Score
    
    
    
    
    
    
    
    

The Hawkeyes scored on the opening drive, with a 2-yard touchdown run by Adam Robinson. But Arizona tied the score at 7 after Trevin Wade returned a Ricky Stanzi interception 38 yards into the end zone. Iowa's defense would again prove to be the difference-maker in this game, not allowing a touchdown until 1:53 was remaining in the game, with the Hawkeyes well ahead. Tyler Sash also netted his seventh interception in five games (dating back to last year).

Penn State

Source: Box Score
    
    
    
    
    
    
    

ESPN's College GameDay was in State College for the Saturday night Big Ten opener. The Hawkeyes fell behind early, 10–0, after a 79-yard pass from Daryll Clark to Chaz Powell on Penn State's first play from scrimmage and then a 20-play drive by the Nittany Lions that led to a Collin Wagner field goal. But Iowa would score 21 unanswered points after that to stun Penn State for the second consecutive year. The defense shut down the Nittany Lions in the final three quarters, forcing four turnovers, and the turning point in the game came when Penn State punted, clinging to a 10–5 lead in the fourth quarter, Adrian Clayborn blocked a punt and ran it back 53 yards for a touchdown to give the Hawkeyes the lead. With the momentum changed, they were more easily able to move the ball on their final two drives. For many Penn State fans, the way the game played out reminded them of the games from their dismal 3–9 (1–7) season with many close losses in 2003, but for many Iowa fans, the way the game played out also brought back memories of 2003, reminding them of their 2003 season where they finished #8 in the nation and beat Penn State 26–14 at home, during a span of three years (2002, 2003, 2004) where they were #8 for three consecutive years and won a share of the conference championship in two of those years (2002 and 2004).

The win at Penn State on prime-time network television catapulted Iowa to a number 13 ranking in the AP Poll and a number 17 ranking in the Coaches' Poll. At year's end, it would also prove to be a selling point for choosing the Hawkeyes over the Nittany Lions for an at-large bid in the Bowl Championship Series.

Arkansas State

Source: Box Score
    
    
    
    
    
    
    

Iowa jumped out to a 14–0 lead behind two touchdown passes by Ricky Stanzi. Unlike Stanzi, the offense would stall, however, which allowed the Red Wolves back into the game before the first half ended, with quarterback Corey Leonard connecting with Brandon Thompkins for a score. The Hawks would answer back in the second half, as Tyler Sash's fifth interception on the year set up a 43-yard TD pass from Stanzi to Marvin McNutt.

Stanzi was then picked off twice, the second interception going 75 yards for a touchdown (Stanzi's 2nd pick-six this year). Daniel Murray extended the lead to 10 with a 20-yard field goal, but Arkansas State wouldn't go away. They took the ball 68 yards in a 17 plays and nearly 8 minutes to close the gap within 3. The Hawkeyes would hold on though to improve their record to 5–0, with Michigan coming to town in a prime-time national telecast next.

Michigan

Source: Box Score
    
    
    
    
    
    
    
    
    
    

The scoring began with Stanzi's third pick-six of the year, with cornerback Donovan Warren taking the intercepted pass 40 yards to give Michigan an early 7–0 lead. Iowa would respond, however, with Stanzi finding tight end Tony Moeaki for a touchdown to cap a nine-play, 57-yard drive. The Wolverines committed five turnovers to the Hawkeyes' one, the most crucial being an interception by Brett Greenwood with 46 seconds remaining in the game to seal Iowa's 10th consecutive victory, the second-longest winning streak in the nation behind Florida.

Wisconsin

Source: Box Score
    
    
    
    
    
    

After a scoreless first quarter, the Badgers jumped to a 10–0 lead after freshman running back Montee Ball scored from 10 yards out. Then, in a scene reminiscent of Iowa's effort at Penn State three weeks earlier, the Hawks rattled off 20 unanswered points, while the defense intercepted Wisconsin QB Scott Tolzien three times. Also similar to the win over Penn State, Tolzien was picked off two times on Wisconsin's final drives that threatened to put Wisconsin in the game again. Unlike that night, Iowa was not trailing in the 4th quarter, they took a 17–10 lead early in the 4th and nearly scored once more up 20–10 in the red zone, but couldn't convert a 4th down. Despite this, the 10-point lead was more than enough for the Hawkeyes to win.

The win, paired with Ohio State's loss at Purdue, gave Iowa sole possession of first place in the Big Ten.

Michigan State

Source: Box Score
    
    
    
    
    
    
    

It was a defensive battle for 58 minutes, with both teams getting very close to the goal line, only to come away with field goals. Down 9–6 in the fourth quarter, the Spartans scored on a 30-yard touchdown pass from Kirk Cousins to Blair White with 1:37 left in the game. But the Hawkeyes would respond by taking the ball down the field. Finally, on 4th and goal at the 7-yard line with 2 seconds remaining, Ricky Stanzi connected with Marvin McNutt for the game-winning touchdown.

The win gave the Hawkeyes its best start in school history at 8–0.

Indiana

Source: Box Score
    
    
    
    
    
    
    
    
    
    

The Hawkeyes' perfect season and hopes at a national championship were in serious jeopardy for three quarters, as Indiana went into the locker room ahead 21–7 at the half thanks to an opening-drive score and special teams miscues by the Hawkeyes (a 9-yard punt and a fumble on a punt return deep in Iowa territory). The Hoosiers looked to extend the lead to three scores when Tyler Sash somehow managed to intercept a Ben Chappell pass and take it 86 yards the other way for a touchdown.

Ricky Stanzi had perhaps his worst game as Iowa's quarterback, throwing five interceptions, four in the third quarter as the Hawkeye offense played into a strong wind from the north. He and his team were able to recover in the fourth quarter, however, as Stanzi found Marvin McNutt for a 92-yard touchdown pass then on the next offensive play, connected with Derrell Johnson-Koulianos for a score from 66 yards out that would put Iowa up for good.

In all, the Hawkeyes scored 28 unanswered points in the final 15 minutes after trailing 24–14 to improve their record to 9–0.

Northwestern

Source: Box Score
    
    
    
    
    

In the first quarter, Ricky Stanzi quickly rattled off 10 points for the Iowa offense, putting them in the lead early. However, those would be the only points the Hawkeyes would score all day, and, as the second quarter drew to a close, the Hawkeyes would find themselves without their starting quarterback, as Stanzi went down with a high ankle sprain, effectively ending his season, and forcing untested backup, freshman James Vandenberg into the spotlight.

The spotlight would prove to be too much for Vandenberg, as he could never mount an effective enough drive to overcome the suddenly mounting score. Iowa would eventually lose the game and their number 4 ranking in the BCS poll.

Ohio State

Source: Box Score
    
    
    
    
    
    
    
    
    

Devin Barclay kicked a 39-yard field goal in overtime to defeat the injured but spirited Iowa Hawkeyes 27-24. James Vandenberg would make his first start in place of injured Ricky Stanzi in this battle for the Big Ten championship and the conference's automatic bid, which would put the winner in the Rose Bowl. Vandenberg showed remarkable poise playing such a big game in a tough environment in Columbus, completing 20 of his 33 passes for two touchdowns, including the game-tying score to Marvin McNutt with 2:42 left in regulation. Derrell Johnson-Koulianos also helped in the Hawks' comeback with a 99-yard kickoff return for a touchdown after Ohio State extended its lead to 24–10 on a 49-yard Brandon Saine run following a Vandenberg interception.  Iowa would not score in its overtime possession however.

Minnesota

Sources: Box score

It was a battle of defenses on Senior Day in Iowa City, as both the Hawkeyes and Gophers combined for 372 total yards and 17 punts, more than the total number of points. The game's lone touchdown came on a 1-yard run by Brandon Wegher with 52 seconds left in the first half. The Hawkeye defense also turned the Gophers away after having four chances to make it a game with the ball on Iowa's 2-yard line.

With the win, Iowa finished the regular season at 10–2 and a final BCS ranking of number 10. On December 6, 2009, they were selected to play the Atlantic Coast Conference champion Georgia Tech Yellow Jackets at the 2010 Orange Bowl in Miami Gardens, Florida on January 5, marking the Hawkeyes' second postseason visit to South Florida in seven years.

Orange Bowl

Source: Box Score
    
    
    
    
    
    

The Hawkeyes came into the 76th Orange Bowl as underdogs to Georgia Tech, but were able to set the tempo at the very beginning. The Hawkeyes brought a piece of Iowa with them to South Florida, the temperature was 49 degrees at kickoff, making it the coldest Orange Bowl on record. After a Marvin McNutt fumble on the game's opening drive led to good field position for the Yellow Jackets' dangerous triple-option attack, the Iowa defense was able to force a 3-and-out.

On the next two offensive drives, quarterback Ricky Stanzi, who had surgery to repair a ligament tear that was a result of his injury against Northwestern, led the Hawkeyes into the end zone, throwing a 3-yard touchdown pass to Marvin McNutt and a 21-yard pass to Colin Sandeman to give Iowa the early 14–0 advantage. But as he had done three times already in 2009, Stanzi also threw an interception that resulted in six points for the other team, with Jerrard Tarrant scoring from 40 yards on the return.

After getting manhandled in the first half, Georgia Tech's offense would wake up, getting into scoring position on their first drive but unable to put points on the board, then getting a one-yard score from Anthony Allen to cap an 11-play, 71-yard drive and bring the Jackets to within a field goal.

Norm Parker's defense, however, was once again able to stop Tech after that, and a 32-yard touchdown by Brandon Wegher with 1:56 remaining would seal Iowa's first major bowl victory since the 1959 Rose Bowl.

Defensive end Adrian Clayborn, who announced he would return to the Hawkeyes next season, was named the Orange Bowl's Most Valuable Player. He had 9 tackles and 2 sacks. The Iowa defense limited Georgia Tech to 143 yards rushing, less than half of their average for the season.

Players in the 2010 NFL Draft

References

Iowa
Iowa Hawkeyes football seasons
Orange Bowl champion seasons
Iowa Hawkeyes football